The Under Secretary for Food, Nutrition, and Consumer Services is a position created within the United States Department of Agriculture in 1993, and is responsible for administrating the department's fifteen nutrition and food security programs and for promoting the dietary guidelines. 

The food assistance programs have a combined budget of $170.5 billion and include the Food Stamp Program, the Special Supplemental Nutrition Program for Women, Infants and Children, the National School Lunch and School Breakfast Programs, and the Commodity Distribution Programs.  In addition, the Undersecretary oversees the Center for Nutrition Policy and Promotion, which leads the development of dietary guidelines and which promotes the guidelines through the Food Guide Pyramid (MyPyramid.gov). 

Goals of the Food, Nutrition, and Consumer Services include combatting obesity, promoting better eating and physical activity habits, and helping needy families obtain a nutritious diet. According to The New York Times, the nutrition segment of the Department of Agriculture received 53% of the department's budget at the time of the creation of the position.

The Under Secretary is appointed by the President and confirmed by the United States Senate. The Under Secretary manages the Food and Nutrition Services and the Center for Nutrition Policy and Promotion. President Trump did not nominate anyone for that position for the first three years of his presidency. He announced his intent to nominate Brandon Lipps on December, 2019, and forwarded his nomination to the Senate on January 6, 2020. His nomination was never confirmed.

List of Under Secretaries

Brandon Lipps is the current Acting Deputy Under Secretary, announced on July 19, 2017. 
Kevin Concannon who was confirmed in July 2009.
Nancy Montanez Johner who served from August 21, 2006, to 2009
Eric M. Bost, who served from June 18, 2001, until July 20, 2006,
Shirley Robinson Watkins, who served from 1997 to 2001, and
Ellen Haas, who served from 1993 to 1997.
Mary Ann Keeffe served as Acting Under Secretary between administrations. The position was created on September 7, 1993, when Secretary of Agriculture Mike Espy announced that the title of Assistant Secretary of Agriculture for Food and Consumer Services would be elevated to the present Under Secretary of Food, Nutrition and Consumer Services title.

References